The Bay Fleet was a summer convoy of trading ships that travelled through the English Channel from and to the important trading areas of the Hanseatic League, Holland and Flanders in the Middle Ages. The fleet's frequent destination was the salt manufacturing lands of the Bay of Bourgneuf.

In 1449, a fleet organised by Henry VI to keep the Channel free of pirates, turned to piracy themselves under the charge of Robert Winnington, attacking the Bay fleet in an unprovoked peace time assault. Sixty Hanseatic ships and fifty ships from the Low countries were taken by the privateers to the Isle of Wight, released only after diplomatic pressure.

Appearing crown-sanctioned, the attack sparked outrage amongst the Hanseatic League and a period of reprisals occurred. Most importantly, English goods (significantly wool) were now excluded from the continental markets. This had severe consequences for a country with an increasingly large and powerful merchant class who relied on trade with the continent. It could also be argued that the effects permeated throughout society, with 2/3 of wool being produced by peasants who must have suffered from the lack of foreign demand.

The attack on the Bay Fleet came at a time of English foreign policy setbacks on the continent, culminating in Charles VII's entry into Normandy in 1459–60. The attack is an example of how English foreign policy resulted in domestic discontent at the poor governance of the King's Council. This was a major factor for Jack Cade's Revolt of 1450.

A letter describing the attack on the Bay Fleet was written by Robert Winnington to Thomas Daniel on 25 May 1449.

References

1449 in Europe
15th century in England
Hanseatic League
Conflicts of the Hundred Years' War
Military units and formations of the Hundred Years' War
Piracy in the Atlantic Ocean
Anti-piracy
Trade routes
History of the Isle of Wight
Medieval economics